The following general officers have served as commander of V Corps since 1918:

Major General William Wright, 12 July 1918 – 20 August 1918
Major General George Cameron, 21 August 1918 to 11 October 1918
Major General Charles Summerall, 12 October 1918 to 2 May 1919
Major General George Read, 3 May 1919 to 3 October 1922
Major General William Cole, 25 January 1936 to 30 September 1938
Major General David Stone, 22 January 1940 to 25 April 1940
Brigadier General Campbell Hodges, 1 June 1940 to 18 October 1940
Major General Edmund Daley, 17 March 1941 to 19 January 1942
Major General William Key, 10 January 1942 to 19 May 1942
Major General Russell Hartle, 20 May 1942 to 14 July 1943
Major General Leonard Gerow, 15 July 1943 to 17 September 1944
Major General Edward Brooks, 18 September 1944 to 4 October 1944
Major General Leonard Gerow, 5 October 1944 to 14 January 1945
Major General Clarence Huebner, 15 January 1945 to 11 November 1945
Major General Frank Milburn, 12 November 1945 to 6 June 1946
Major General Orlando Ward, 7 June 1946 to 15 November 1946
Major General Stafford Irwin, 16 November 1946 to 31 October 1948
Lieutenant General John Hodge, 1 November 1948 to 31 August 1950
Lieutenant General John Leonard, 1 September 1950 to 18 June 1951
Brigadier General Boniface Campbell, 19 June 1951 to 1 August 1951
Major General John Dahlquist, 2 August 1951 to 4 March 1953
Major General Ira Swift, 5 March 1953 to 17 June 1954
Lieutenant General Charles Hart, 18 June 1954 to 28 March 1956
Lieutenant General Lemuel Mathewson, 29 March 1956 to 16 August 1957
Lieutenant General Francis Farrell, 17 August 1957 to 31 March 1959
Lieutenant General Paul Adams, 1 April 1959 to 30 September 1960
Lieutenant General Frederic J. Brown II, 1 October 1960 to 28 August 1961
Lieutenant General John Waters, 29 August 1961 to 14 May 1962
Lieutenant General John Michaelis, 15 May 1962 to 14 July 1963
Lieutenant General Creighton Abrams, 15 July 1963 to 3 August 1964
Lieutenant General James Polk, 1 September 1964 to 27 February 1966
Lieutenant General George Mather, 28 February 1966 to 31 May 1967
Lieutenant General Andrew Boyle, 1 July 1967 to 31 July 1969
Lieutenant General Claire Hutchin, 15 September 1969 to 23 January 1971
Lieutenant General Willard Pearson, 14 February 1971 to 31 May 1973
Lieutenant General William Desobry, 1 June 1973 to 24 August 1975
Lieutenant General Robert Fair, 25 August 1975 to 4 January 1976
Lieutenant General Donn Starry, 16 February 1976 to 17 June 1977
Lieutenant General Sidney Berry, 19 July 1977 to 27 February 1980
Lieutenant General Willard Scott, 27 February 1980 to 15 July 1981
Lieutenant General Paul Williams, 15 July 1981 to 29 May 1984
Lieutenant General Robert Wetzel, 29 May 1984 to 23 June 1986
Lieutenant General Colin Powell, 23 June 1986 to 1 January 1987
Major General Lincoln Jones, 1 January 1987 to 23 March 1987
Lieutenant General John Woodmansee, 23 March 1987 to 21 July 1989
Lieutenant General George Joulwan, 7 August 1989 to 9 November 1990
Lieutenant General David Maddox, 9 November 1990 to 17 June 1992
Lieutenant General Jerry Rutherford, 17 June 1992 to 6 April 1995
Lieutenant General John Abrams, 6 April 1995 to 31 July 1997
Lieutenant General John Hendrix, 31 July 1997 to 16 November 1999
Lieutenant General James Riley, 16 November 1999 to 18 July 2001
Lieutenant General William Wallace, 18 July 2001 to 14 June 2003
Lieutenant General Ricardo Sanchez, 14 June 2003 to 6 September 2006
Major General Fred Robinson, 6 September 2006 to 19 January 2007
Lieutenant General James Thurman, 19 January 2007 to 8 August 2007
Lieutenant General Kenneth Hunzeker, 8 August 2007 to 31 July 2009
Brigadier General Michael Ryan, 8 August 2009 to 3 November 2010
Brigadier General Allen Batschelet, 3 November 2010 to June 2011
Brigadier General Ricky Gibbs, June 2011 to 10 January 2012
Lieutenant General James Terry, 10 January 2012 to 15 September 2013
Lieutenant General John Kolasheski, 4 August 2020 to present

References

Sources
United States. Dept. of Army. Headquarters, V Corps. "It Will Be Done!" U.S. Army V Corps, 1918–2009: a pictorial history. Harold E. Raugh, Jr., Ed. Grafenwoehr, Germany: Druckerei Hutzler, 2009.

Lists of United States military unit commanders
United States Army officers
Corps of the United States Army